Magkaribal (International title: Rivals) is a 2010 Philippine drama television series starring Bea Alonzo and Gretchen Barretto. The series ran on ABS-CBN from June 28, 2010, to November 5, 2010. replacing Pinoy Big Brother: Teen Clash 2010

Premise

Two sisters, Anna and Angela Abella, are separated due to a tragedy caused by their long family back story.

Anna trains herself to be a perfect Filipina model and fashion designer under her new name Victoria Valera. Meanwhile, Angela is adopted by the Agustins and is renamed Angela “Gelai” Agustin. Both of them end up having the same ambition in fashion as they did in their childhood together. So they cross paths in the fashion industry unaware that they are sisters and greedily end up as rivals; not just in their careers, but also in love.

Vera Cruz is a famous model and fashion designer, and is also the woman in the past who caused the Abella family's destruction. Now she is ready to keep the two women fighting, and aims to destroy Victoria's image to Gelai to avoid their closure. Vera is determined to stop the Abella sisters uniting against her to dethrone her. But what if the two eventually find out the truth? Can they heal the wounds out of their rivalry?

Cast and characters

Main cast

 Bea Alonzo as Angela "Gelai" Agustin / Angela Abella
 Gretchen Barretto as Victoria Valera / Anna Abella
 Angel Aquino as Vera Cruz-Abella
 Derek Ramsay as Louie Villamor
 Erich Gonzales as Chloe C. Abella
 Enchong Dee as Caloy Javier

Supporting cast
 Robert Arevalo as Ronaldo Valera 
 Mark Gil as Manuel Abella
 John Arcilla as Hermes Agustin
Arlene Muhlach as Sonia Agustin
Lyka Ugarte as Betsy
 Bianca Manalo as Gigi Fernando
Nina Ricci Alagao as Donna
 Beatriz Saw as Kate Delovieres
Toffee Calma as Jean Paul
R.S. Francisco as Gian Franco
Artemio Abad as Johnny
 Rodjun Cruz as Calvin
 Marc Abaya as Neil Olaguer
Lorenzo Mara as Salvador
R.J. Ledesma as Christian Ocampo
Edward Mendez as Marc Laurel
 Christian Vasquez as Paul
 Irma Adlawan as Carolina

Special participation
 Kathryn Bernardo as young Anna/Victoria 
 Barbie Sabino as young Angela/Gelai 
 Nash Aguas as young Louie/Doz
 Dimples Romana as Stella Abella
 James Blanco as young Manuel
 Alessandra de Rossi as young Vera
 Allan Paule as young Ronaldo

Episodes

Production
The show is set the fashion world and includes costuming and cameo appearances by local designers. According to several executives behind the show's production, the series was originally planned to stage the comeback of actress Donna Cruz. During the course of pre-production, Cruz was to play Angela Abella/Gelai Agustin, and Angel Aquino was initially considered to portray the role of Anna Abella/Victoria Valera. Christopher de Leon was also tapped to play the role of Manuel, and Cherie Gil was shortlisted as Vera Cruz. The series also included Derek Ramsay as Louie, Enchong Dee as Caloy, and Erich Gonzales as Chloe. After Cruz backed out due to her commitments in Cebu where she permanently resides, ABS-CBN tapped real-life sisters Gretchen Barretto and Claudine Barretto for the roles of Anna/Victoria and Angela/Gelai respectively. After the latter's transfer to GMA Network along with actors de Leon and Gil, the production was again delayed. It was only until Bea Alonzo's casting as Angela Abella/Gelai Agustin that the series continued to develop, with Barretto retaining the role as Anna/Victoria, and Aquino this time playing the role of Vera.  Mark Gil took the role of Manuel in the final casting of characters. A young Kathryn Bernardo would be cast in the role of a young Anna/Vera, which she did she simultaneously with GMA Network series Endless Love wherein she played the role of young Jenny. Following her performance in Magkaribal, she went on to be cast as Mara in the Mara Clara remake.

Reception
Magkaribal received heavy promotion as competition for GMA Network's Endless Love, whose pilot aired at the same time (even though Magkaribal aired a little later than Endless Love). The show premiered on June 28, 2010, with a 25.3% national household rating against its direct competition, Diva on GMA Network with a 19.4% national household rating (Endless Love scored a pilot rating of 22.9%, which aired earlier than Magkaribal). Magkaribal posted a 30.0% national household rating on its finale against its rival show (direct competition in the timeslot), Beauty Queen, which only managed to score a 14.4% national household rating.

Awards and recognitions

International Broadcast 
As with many ABS-CBN teleseryes, Magkaribal aired in Kenya dubbed in English under the title Rivals. It was broadcast on NTV during the prime 6pm - 7pm timeslot in 2011.

See also
 List of programs broadcast by ABS-CBN
 List of programs aired by ABS-CBN
 List of telenovelas of ABS-CBN

References

External links
Official website

ABS-CBN drama series
2010 Philippine television series debuts
2010 Philippine television series endings
Television series by Star Creatives
Philippine melodrama television series
Philippine romance television series
Fashion-themed television series
Filipino-language television shows
Television shows set in the Philippines